Kušić is a Serbian surname, derived from Kuša, a diminutive of the masculine given name Kuzman.

Vojo Kushi (Kušić), Albanian national hero

See also
Kušići, village in Serbia
Kušiljevo, village in Serbia
Kusić (disambiguation)
Kužić, surname

Serbian surnames